Abdul Khalek is a Bangladeshi art director and production manager. He won Bangladesh National Film Award for Best Art Direction for the film Agaman (1988).

Selected films
 Bandi Theke Begum - 1975
 Nishan - 1977
 Alankar - 1978
 Notun Bou - 1983
 Nazma - 1983
 The Hunger - 1984
 Ranga Bhabi - 1989
 Mayer Doa - 1990
 Santona - 1991
 Golapi Ekhon Dhakai - 1994

Awards and nominations
National Film Awards

References

External links
 

Date of birth missing (living people)
Living people
Bangladeshi art directors
Best Art Direction National Film Award (Bangladesh) winners
Year of birth missing (living people)